The Venus of Lespugue is a Venus figurine, a statuette of a nude female figure of the Gravettian, dated to between 26,000 and 24,000 years ago.

Discovery
It was discovered in 1922 in the Rideaux cave of Lespugue (Haute-Garonne) in the foothills of the Pyrenees by René de Saint-Périer (1877-1950).

Approximately 6 inches (150 mm) tall, it is carved from tusk ivory, and was damaged during excavation.

Features
Of all the steatopygous Venus figurines discovered from the upper Paleolithic, the Venus of Lespugue, if the reconstruction is sound, appears to display the most exaggerated female secondary sexual characteristics, especially the extremely large, pendulous breasts.

According to textile expert Elizabeth Wayland Barber, the statue displays the earliest representation found of spun thread, as the carving shows a skirt hanging from below the hips, made of twisted fibers, frayed at the end.

Location
The Venus of Lespugue resides in France, at the Musée de l'Homme.

See also
Art of the Upper Paleolithic
List of Stone Age art

Notes

External links
 Don Hitchcock (Don's Maps): "The Lespugue Venus is a 25 000 years old ivory figurine of a nude female figure"
https://web.archive.org/web/20040413133422/http://www.arthistory.sbc.edu/imageswomen/lespugue.html

Lespugue
Haute-Garonne
Archaeological discoveries in France
Ivory works of art
Prehistoric art in France
Gravettian